Avenida Antonio Arnáiz Somoza, or simply Avenida Arnáiz, formerly known as Calle Libertad and then Calzada de Pásay, is a major east–west collector road that links Makati and Pasay in the Philippines. It stretches across western Metro Manila from Roxas Boulevard in Pasay to Epifanio de los Santos Avenue (EDSA) in Makati.

The Osmeña Highway splits Arnaiz Avenue into two sections. The western section found in Pasay is a congested and highly pedestrianized road that used to be known as Calle Libertad. This section passes through some of the most important Pasay landmarks such as the Cuneta Astrodome, Cartimar shopping district and Santa Clara de Montefalco Church. Also located within the vicinity are the Department of Foreign Affairs building, old Pasay City Hall, Pasay City Sports Complex, and Pasay Cemetery. East of Osmeña Highway, the avenue enters the Makati Central Business District where it merges with traffic from a Skyway ramp near the Amorsolo Street junction. It continues across Legazpi and San Lorenzo villages of the Makati CBD which contains several office towers and condominiums such as Cityland Pasong Tamo Tower and Avida Towers, a number of Japanese restaurants, a Walter Mart mall, the old Plaza Fair, Don Bosco, and the Ayala Center. This section of the road in Makati used to be known as Pasay Road. Its eastern terminus is at its junction with EDSA near Dusit Thani Hotel.

The avenue was named after the Filipino aviation pioneer, Col. Antonio Somoza Arnaiz. The western section is served by the Libertad LRT Station along Taft Avenue, while the eastern section is served by the Pasay Road railway station along Osmeña Highway, and the Ayala MRT Station along EDSA.

Route description
The avenue is divided into two portions, one used to be named Libertad Street and the other was named Pasay Road.

Libertad Street

Arnaiz Avenue starts at an intersection with Roxas Boulevard northbound near Cuneta Astrodome. It then crosses F.B. Harrison Street and then crosses Taft Avenue near the Pasay Public Market and Mall and the Libertad LRT station. At this portion, the road is heavily pedestrianized and traffic queues are mostly common. It then crosses P. Zamora and P. Burgos Streets near St. Mary's Academy - Pasay and Tramo Street and crosses Estero de Tripa de Gallina (Tripa de Gallina Creek) at the Cementina Dolores Bridge on the Pasay–Makati boundary. It soon ends at a traffic light intersection with Osmeña Highway in Pio del Pilar, near the Pasay Road PNR station.

Pasay Road

After crossing Osmeña Highway, it becomes a one-way street carrying westbound traffic until it crosses Chino Roces Avenue near Walter Mart Makati. The Skyway exit to Amorsolo Street stands above the avenue until it curves downward toward Amorsolo Street, while its entry ramp towards Skyway southbound is situated on the avenue to accommodate westbound traffic only. Past Amorsolo Street, it crosses Paseo de Roxas near Greenbelt and Makati Avenue near Glorietta until it ends at a traffic light intersection with EDSA. The avenue is lined with hotels, namely New World Makati, Fairmont Makati, and Crown Regency between Paseo de Roxas and EDSA.

History
The present avenue originated from an old street linking the coast of Manila Bay in Pasay to Barrio Culi-Culi (now Barangay Pio del Pilar) in San Pedro de Macati. It was later extended to the east up to Fort McKinley, making it known as Pasay–McKinley Road and other various names recognized by the government per section. It was also designated as Route 57 or Highway 57. The road became disconnected in the 1950s when the Makati Commercial Center complex (now Glorietta complex at Ayala Center) was built over its segment between Highway 54 (now EDSA) and Makati Avenue, thus realigning it south of the new commercial center, approaching Dasmariñas Village. The disconnected segment towards Fort McKinley became a separate road that is presently known as McKinley Road. It was then renamed in 1984 to Antonio S. Arnaiz Avenue, by virtue of Batas Pambansa Blg. 783.

Intersections

References

Streets in Metro Manila
Makati
Pasay
Makati Central Business District